Kirkbuddo is a village in the county of Angus, Scotland, between the towns of Forfar and Carnoustie. Nearby lie the remains of a temporary Roman marching camp dating to the third century AD. A worn type II Pictish stone was found in the kirkyard there in the mid-twentieth century and has subsequently been donated to the Meffan institute in Forfar.

References

Villages in Angus, Scotland